American singer SZA has released two studio albums, three extended plays (EPs), and 16 singles. In October 2012, SZA self-released her debut EP titled See.SZA.Run, which she then followed up with her second EP, titled S, in April 2013. In July 2013, it was revealed that she had signed to the hip hop record label Top Dawg Entertainment, through which she released Z, her third EP and first retail release, in April 2014.

SZA's debut studio album, Ctrl, was released on June 9, 2017. It was supported by the singles "Drew Barrymore", "Love Galore", "The Weekend" and "Broken Clocks", two of which charted in the top 40 of the Billboard Hot 100 and became 5× Platinum certified by the Recording Industry Association of America (RIAA). The album also debuted at number three on the Billboard 200 and earned SZA five Grammy Award nominations. SZA went on to achieve three top-ten songs on the Billboard Hot 100 with her collaborations with Maroon 5 on "What Lovers Do", Kendrick Lamar on "All the Stars", and Doja Cat on "Kiss Me More", the latter of which earned SZA the Grammy Award for Best Pop Duo/Group Performance.

SZA released her second studio album, SOS, on December 9, 2022. It was supported by the singles "Good Days", "I Hate U", "Shirt", "Nobody Gets Me", and "Kill Bill", four of which were top-ten hits on the Billboard Hot 100. SOS became SZA's first number-one album on the Billboard 200 and broke the record for the largest streaming week for an R&B album.

Studio albums

Extended plays

Singles

As lead artist

As featured artist

Promotional singles

Other charted and certified songs

Guest appearances

Music videos

Songwriting credits

Notes

References

Discographies of American artists
Rhythm and blues discographies
Discography